Tuebrook and Stoneycroft is a sub-urban Liverpool City Council Ward within the Liverpool West Derby Parliamentary constituency. It contains the Tuebrook and Stoneycroft areas of Liverpool. The population of this ward at the 2011 census was 16,489. In 2004 it was reformed taking in small parts of the former Old Swan, Clubmoor, Croxteth and Anfield wards, and losing small areas elsewhere. The ward elects 3 councillors.

Councillors

 indicates seat up for re-election after boundary changes.

 indicates seat up for re-election.

 indicates change in affiliation.

 indicates seat up for re-election after casual vacancy.

Election results

Elections of the 2020s

Elections of the 2010s

Elections of the 2000s

After the boundary change of 2004 the whole of Liverpool City Council faced election. Three Councillors were returned at this election.

External links
Tuebrook & Stoneycroft Ward Profile

References

Wards of Liverpool